Peter Baldwin Bonerz (born August 6, 1938) is an American director and actor.

Early life
Bonerzwas born in Portsmouth, New Hampshire, to Elfrieda (née Kern) and Christopher Bonerz. He grew up in Milwaukee, Wisconsin, where he attended Marquette University High School. Here, performing with the Prep Players, he gained his first theatrical experience. At Marquette University, he participated in the Marquette University Players. After graduating with a Bachelor of Science degree in 1960, he decided to seek a career in theater, starting in New York City in improv with a troupe called The Premise. After compulsory service as a draftee in the United States Army, he worked with an improv troupe in San Francisco known as The Committee, whose members included Rob Reiner, David Ogden Stiers, Howard Hesseman and Hamilton Camp.

Career
Bonerz's first network television appearance was in 1965 on The Addams Family in the season-two episode "Morticia, The Writer". He had several more TV appearances in the late 1960s and also had roles in several films, including Funnyman (1967); What Ever Happened to Aunt Alice? (1969); Medium Cool (1969); Catch-22 (1970), which also included his future co-star Bob Newhart; Jennifer on My Mind (1971); and Fuzz (1972). In 1971, Bonerz was part of an ensemble cast in the short-lived improvisational television show Story Theatre, which also included Alan Alda and Valerie Harper. In 1972, he landed the popular supporting role of Dr. Jerry Robinson, the eccentric orthodontist on The Bob Newhart Show, whose most frequent comic foil was Marcia Wallace as Carol, the sharp-tongued receptionist.  Bonerz would reprise this role in a cameo appearance in the final, unaired episode of Bob Newhart's third series, Bob. He also directed 29 episodes.  The show ran for six seasons, with ratings among the top 20 in the first three seasons.

His later acting roles included the TV miniseries The Bastard (1978) and as a psychiatrist in the movie Serial (1980). In 1979, Bonerz appeared on Password Plus as a game show contestant/celebrity guest star with Marcia Wallace, his costar from The Bob Newhart Show. In 1986, Bonerz co-starred with Tuesday Weld and River Phoenix in the television movie Circle of Violence: A Family Drama. In 1999, he played Ed. Weinberger in the movie Man on the Moon. He voiced Sal in the Aaahh!!! Real Monsters episode "Internal Affairs". In 2014, he played Doug Demarco in the "Anniversaries" episode of Parks and Recreation.

Beginning in 1974, Bonerz directed 29 episodes of The Bob Newhart Show. Between 1974 and 2011, he directed over 350 episodes of various shows, including series like Murphy Brown (93 episodes), Home Improvement (29 episodes), E/R (22 episodes), Friends (12 episodes), Joey (TV series) (3 episodes), and many others such as Wings, NewsRadio, Archie Bunker's Place, and ALF. He also directed films such as Nobody's Perfekt (1981) and Police Academy 6: City Under Siege (1989).

Personal life
Peter Bonerz married his wife Rosalind DiTrapani in 1963; together they have two children, Eli and Eric.

Filmography as director
 1979: McGurk: A Dog's Life
 1980: Love, Natalie 
 1980: G.I.'s 
 1981: Nobody's Perfekt
 1982: In Security
 1982: High Five (TV short)
 1983: Focus on Fishko (short)
 1984: Back Together
 1984: Suzanne Pleshette Is Maggie Briggs
 1985: The Recovery Room
 1988: Sharing Richard
 1989: Police Academy 6: City Under Siege
 1989: Julie Brown: The Show (TV short)
 1993: The Elvira Show (TV short)
 2006: Drive/II

References

External links
 
 
 

1938 births
Living people
Male actors from New Hampshire
American male film actors
American male television actors
American television directors
Comedy film directors
Marquette University alumni
People from Portsmouth, New Hampshire
Military personnel from Milwaukee
Military personnel from New Hampshire
20th-century American male actors
21st-century American male actors
United States Army soldiers
Directors Guild of America Award winners
Male actors from Milwaukee
Film directors from New Hampshire
Marquette University High School alumni